The Semper Synagogue, also known as the Dresden Synagogue, designed by Gottfried Semper and built from 1838 to 1840, was dedicated on 8 May 1840. It was an early example of the Moorish Revival style of synagogue architecture.

History and destruction

The synagogue was destroyed in 1938 on Kristallnacht. Members of the SA and SS burned down the synagogue on the night of 9 November 1938, almost one hundred years after the opening of the synagogue. A few days after the burning, the ruins were carried away "professionally" and the bill to cover these costs was handed to the Jewish congregation. A film made by the "Technischen Hilfswerk" documented the efficient removal of the building. All that remains of the synagogue is the Star of David which was designed by Semper, which Alfred Neugebauer, a fireman, removed from the burning rooftop, hid and returned to the congregation in 1949.

Architecture

Interior

While the exterior was Romanesque, its interior featured the richly ornamented style that was to become the hallmark of Moorish Revival architecture. The elaborate Arabic-style interior had a two-tiered balcony supported by columns copied from the Alhambra. The arches and balcony fronts were richly worked with intricate polychrome foliate and lattice designs in the Moorish style. According to Harry Frances Mallgrave, most of the ornaments "were painted on the plaster surfaces in imitation of more costly materials."

Exterior

The synagogue was situated along the old city ramparts, along the river, some five hundred meters from the new theatre (known as the Semperoper) that Gottfried Semper was constructing at the same time he built the synagogue. The building was purposely designed to be modest, as Chief Rabbi Dr Zacharias Frankel said at the opening ceremony: "we were not driven by the desire to brag with an opulent building; rather we wanted to find an appropriate place of worship, (...) where we show ourselves before God in devout communion."
The synagogue was a plain cube structure, built in a Romanesque style with a humble vestibule and twin towers that marked the entrance to the building.

Eternal light

The interior design included furnishings - all designed by Semper, who considered each project as a Gesamtkunstwerk. For the synagogue he created a Ner Tamid - silver lamp of eternal light, placed before the Torah scrolls, which caught Richard Wagner and his wife Cosima's fancy. They gave a great deal of effort to procure a copy of this lamp.

Historical importance

Semper was the first architect to borrow the Moorish iconography for a synagogue. His countless imitators and followers include Semper's student Otto Simonson, who would construct the magnificent Moorish Revival Leipzig synagogue in 1855, and Adolf Wolff, who built the Great Synagogue of Łódź and synagogues in Nürnberg, Stuttgart, Helbronn and Ulm. Many other architects of the late 19th century followed the style of this synagogue.

New Synagogue

The New Synagogue, inaugurated in 2001, was erected next to the site of the Semper synagogue where a monument showing a six branch menorah stands in memory of the six million Jews murdered by the Nazis.

References

External links 

The Semper Synagogue, Pictures 
Fancis Morrone, Moorish Influence At Home in the City New York Sun, December 15, 2006  
 

Moorish Revival synagogues
Synagogues completed in 1840
Synagogues destroyed during Kristallnacht (Germany)
Synagogues in Saxony
Buildings and structures in Dresden
Religion in Dresden